Friedrich Wilhelm Konrad von Brodowski, known as Fritz, (November 26, 1886 – October 28, 1944) was a German army general of the Second World War, successively Commander in Kiev, Ukraine, Commander in Lille, and commanding officer at Clermont-Ferrand. 

He was controversially killed while a prisoner of war of French forces in 1944. His death led to the murder, by way of a reprisal, of an imprisoned French army general, Gustave Mesny.

Biography 
Fritz von Brodowski was the son of Prussian General Fedor von Brodowski (1841–1923).

On March 10, 1904, in Brandenburg an der Havel, Brodowski was admitted as an officer cadet into the 6th (Brandenburg) Cuirassiers "Emperor Nicholas I of Russia" of the Prussian Army. From November 6, 1904 to July 8, 1905 he studied at the Glogau Military School and subsequently was commissioned as a lieutenant. Brodowski served within his regiment from October 21, 1908 as the "Gerichtsoffizier" (that is, an officer for legal matters) and on October 18, 1909 was transferred to the Guards Cuirassiers. From October 1, 1912, Brodowski underwent further training at the Prussian Military Academy, which he left upon the outbreak of the First World War in July 1914.

First World War
After mobilization, Brodowski served first as a squadron officer and then, from August 6, 1914, as an aide-de-camp on the staff of the 3rd and 1st Cavalry Brigades. He was promoted to captain on December 24, 1914. At the end of June 1917 he was transferred to the reserve squadron of the Guards Cuirassier Regiment and commanded the reserve battalion of the Kaiser Franz Garde-Grenadier-Regiment 2. A month later, Brodowski joined a battalion of the Queen Elizabeth Garde-Grenadier-Regiment Nr. 3. There, he was entrusted with the leadership of the Fusilier Battalion on August 4, 1917. Brodowski was wounded on September 30, 1918, during the defensive battles on the Western Front near Cambrai and Saint-Quentin, and spent the remaining weeks of the war in hospital.

For his wartime achievements, he was awarded the Knight's Cross of the Royal House Order of Hohenzollern, the Iron Cross first and second class, the Wound Badge in black as well as the Knight's Cross 2nd Class of the Order of the Zähringer Lion with swords and oak leaves and the Knight's Cross First Class of the Order of Albert with swords.

After his recovery, in December 1918, Brodowski was transferred to the General Staff of the army in Berlin. On January 18, 1919, he returned to the demobilizing Guards Cuirassiers. Elements of the regiment became Freikorps formations and Brodowski on February 1, 1919 was appointed as the leader of a volunteer squadron. On April 11, 1919, he was reappointed to the Provisional Reichswehr and on November 1, 1919 assigned to the 3rd Cavalry Regiment. Brodowski was squadron commander of the 4th (Prussian) Cavalry Regiment from February 24, 1920 to March 31, 1922. He was then transferred to the Ministry of Defence in Berlin for one year. He was promoted toLieutenant Colonel on April 1, 1931 and on November 1, 1931 was given command of the 16th Cavalry Regiment in Kassel. In this position he was promoted to Colonel on October 1, 1933. With the transition of the Reichswehr into the Wehrmacht, on April 13, 1935 Brodowski was appointed inspector of military recruitment at Ulm. He was further promoted to Major General on January 1, 1937. From May 1938 to December 26, 1941, he was Inspector of the Armed Forces Reserves, based in  Stuttgart.

Second World War
In June 1942, Brodowski was appointed as head of the Feldersatz-Division B (Replacement Field Division B), gathering replacement troops to defend the River Don line.  From September 25, 1942 to March 14, 1943, he commanded the 404th Division (Landesschützen) in Dresden. Brodowski was then appointed Chief of Staff for instruction to the Commander of the Wehrmacht in Netherlands. He was then successively Commander in Kiev, Ukraine, in the summer of 1943, then Commander in Lille.

On April 15, 1944 Brodowski became commanding officer at Clermont-Ferrand, where he commanded Hauptverbindungsstäbe (HVS) 588, responsible for 9 departments in central France:
 Corrèze
 Haute-Vienne
 Creuse
 Dordogne
 Haute-Loire
 Puy-de-Dôme
 Cantal
 Allier
 Indre

The "Hauptverbindungsstäbe" were the main staff liaison placed with regional prefects who controlled, through the Verbindungsstäbe (VS), departmental prefects.

In May 1944, General von Brodowski, worried about concentrations of the maquis in Cantal, a sparsely populated area of 65,000 square kilometers, asked the Kommandant Heeresgebiet Südfrankreich (KHS), the military command of the Army area in Southern France, to transfer to Lyon troop units to combat the resistance. General Curt von Jesser in May 1944 created the Jesser Column, a force of about 5,000 soldiers, including units of the 2nd SS Panzer Division Das Reich, to suppress and destroy the Maquis in the Auvergne and Limousin regions from June to August 1944. These units wiped out the population of the town of Oradour-sur-Glane in June 1944, shortly after the Allied landings in Normandy, and Brodowski was therefore seen by the French as one of those responsible.

In September 1944, Brodowski was the head of the Kampfgruppe "von Brodowski" and fought in the Battle of the Vosges. Brodowski was captured by French troops near Jussey on October 27, 1944. He was imprisoned in the fortress of Besançon and was there held in solitary confinement by the French Forces of the Interior. He was shot dead on October 28 by his guards. According to the guards, Brodowski had attempted to escape. Brodowski was buried with military honors by the French military authorities, who investigated the guards' actions and came to the formal conclusion that Brodowski had attempted to escape. However, the killing remained unresolved.

Brodowski's death was announced on November 8, 1944, by the French channel Radio Londres and the Swiss News Agency on the following day. Adolf Hitler then ordered the randomly chosen murder of a French general, Maurice Mesny, as a reprisal. Mesny was killed by the SS on January 19, 1945 in the course of a prison transfer.

Awards
Knight's Cross of the Royal House Order of Hohenzollern
Iron Cross (1914)
2nd Class
1st Class
Wound Badge (1914) in Black
Knight's Cross 2nd Class of the Order of the Zähringer Lion with Oak Leaves and Swords
Knight's Cross First Class of the Order of Albert with Swords

References

Sources 
 Louis Le Moigne and Marcel Barbanceys, Sédentaires, réfractaires et maquisards : L'Armée secrète en Haute-Corrèze (1942–1944), Association Amicale des Maquis A. S. de Haute-Corrèze, 1979.
 Dermot Bradley (Publ.): Die Generale des Heeres 1921–1945. Die militärischen Werdegänge der Generale, sowie der Ärzte, Veterinäre, Intendanten, Richter und Ministerialbeamten im Generalsrang. Vol 2: von. Blanckensee–von. Czettritz und Neuhauß. Biblio Verlag, Osnabrück 1993, pp. 276–278.
 Fritz von Brodowski on Axis History Forum

External links 
 Kommandant Heeresgebiet Südfrankreich: Schlussbericht für die Zeit vom 1.7.-2.9.1944, BA-MA RW 36/1316, bei Institut d'histoire du temps présent (IHTP)
 Archivbestand (PDF; 127 kB), bei Institut für Zeitgeschichte

1886 births
1944 deaths
People from Koszalin
People from the Province of Pomerania
German prisoners of war in World War II held by France
German people who died in prison custody
German Army personnel killed in World War II
Lieutenant generals of the German Army (Wehrmacht)
Prussian Army personnel
Recipients of the Iron Cross (1914), 1st class
20th-century Freikorps personnel
Deaths by firearm in France
Prisoners who died in French detention
German Army generals of World War II